A softcam is a software based camera.

Softcam, softCAM, or soft cam may also refer to:
 Software emulation of a conditional-access module (CAM)
 Software used for computer-aided manufacturing (CAM)
 Soft cam, a cam device on a compound bow

See also
 SoftCamp